The Ogaden War, or the Ethio-Somali War, was a military conflict fought between Somalia and Ethiopia from July 1977 to March 1978 over the Ethiopian region of Ogaden. Somalia's invasion of the region, precursor to the wider war, met with the Soviet Union's disapproval, leading the superpower to end its support of Somalia and support Ethiopia instead.

Ethiopia was saved from defeat and permanent loss of territory through a massive airlift of military supplies worth $1 billion, the arrival of more than 12,000 Cuban soldiers and airmen sent by Fidel Castro to win a second African victory (after his first success in Angola in 1975–76), and 1,500 Soviet advisors, led by General Vasily Petrov. On 23 January 1978, Cuban armored brigades inflicted the worst losses the Somali forces had ever taken in a single action since the start of the war.

The Cubans (equipped with 300 tanks, 156 artillery pieces and 46 combat aircraft) prevailed at Harar, Dire Dawa and Jijiga, and began to push the Somalis systematically out of the Ogaden. By 23 March 1978, the Cuban backed Ethiopian army had recaptured more than two-thirds of the Ogaden, marking the official end of the war. Almost a third of the regular SNA soldiers, three-eighths of the armored units and half of the Somali Air Force had been lost during the war. The war left Somalia with a disorganized and demoralized army as well as a heavy disapproval from its population. These conditions led to a revolt in the army which eventually spiraled into the ongoing Somali Civil War.

Background
Before the proclamation of an independent Somali state, a greater de facto Somalia already existed within the framework of foreign powers. In 1936, after the capture of Ethiopia by Italy, Italian East Africa was formed, uniting all Italian colonial possessions (Eritrea, Ethiopia, Italian Somalia) in the Horn of Africa, including British Somaliland in 1940. The Italian colonial administration thus united most of the territories that had a predominantly Somali population. Italian East Africa was divided into governorates, and the Somalia Governorate included Somali-majority territories not part of present-day Somalia.

In 1941, during the British East African campaign (May–April), the Italians were defeated and the Italian colonial administration across all of Italian East Africa was replaced by a British military administration.

On 31 January 1942, Ethiopia and the United Kingdom signed the first "Anglo-Ethiopian Agreement", ending British military occupation in most of Ethiopia except Ogaden (British troops remained in Ethiopia until 1955). As part of the second "Anglo-Ethiopian Agreement", the British military administration remained in the Ogaden province and in the so-called "Reserved Zone", adjacent to Somalia and constituting a third of Ethiopia's territory, until 19 December 1946. In 1949, the British occupation administration created the British Ogaden Protectorate, which ceased to exist in 1954. The British military contingent was withdrawn from the Ogaden in 1955, and the Ogaden became part of Abyssinia.

Territorial partition
Following World War II, Britain retained control of both British Somaliland and Italian Somaliland as protectorates. In 1950, as a result of the Paris Peace Treaties, the United Nations granted Italy trusteeship of Italian Somaliland, but only under close supervision and on the condition—first proposed by the Somali Youth League (SYL) and other nascent Somali political organizations, such as Hizbia Digil Mirifle Somali (HDMS) and the Somali National League (SNL)—that Somalia achieve independence within ten years. British Somaliland remained a protectorate of Britain until 1960.

In 1948, under pressure from their World War II allies and to the dismay of the Somalis, the British gave the Haud (an important Somali grazing area that was presumably 'protected' by British treaties with the Somalis in 1884 and 1886) and the Ogaden to Ethiopia, based on an 1897 treaty in which the British, French and Italians agreed upon the territorial boundaries of the Ethiopian Empire with Emperor Menelik II in exchange for his help against raids by hostile clans.

Britain included the provision that the Somali residents would retain their autonomy, but Ethiopia immediately claimed sovereignty over the area. This prompted an unsuccessful bid by the United Kingdom in 1956 to buy back the Somali lands it had turned over. The UK also granted administration of the almost exclusively Somali-inhabited Northern Frontier District (NFD) to Kenyan nationalists despite an informal plebiscite demonstrating the overwhelming desire of the region's population to join the newly formed Somali Republic.

A referendum was held in neighboring Djibouti (then known as French Somaliland) in 1958, on the eve of Somalia's 1960 independence, to decide whether or not to join the Somali Republic or to remain with France. The referendum turned out in favour of a continued association with France, largely due to a combined yes vote by the sizable Afar ethnic group and resident Europeans. There was also widespread vote rigging, with the French expelling thousands of Somalis before the referendum reached the polls.

The majority of those who voted "no" were Somalis strongly in favour of joining a united Somalia, as proposed by Mahmoud Harbi, Vice President of the Government Council. Harbi was killed in a plane crash two years later. Djibouti finally gained its independence from France in 1977, and Hassan Gouled Aptidon, who had campaigned for a "yes" vote in the 1958 referendum, eventually became Djibouti's first president, serving from 1977 to 1999.

British Somaliland became independent on 26 June 1960 as the State of Somaliland; the Trust Territory of Somalia (former Italian Somaliland) followed suit five days later. On 1 July 1960, the two territories united to form the Somali Republic. A government was formed by Abdullahi Issa and other members of the trusteeship and protectorate governments, with Haji Bashir Ismail Yusuf as President of the Somali National Assembly, Aden Abdullah Osman Daar as President of the Somali Republic and Abdirashid Ali Shermarke as Prime Minister (later president from 1967 to 1969). On 20 July 1961, through a popular referendum, the people of Somalia ratified a new constitution that had first been drafted the previous year.

On 15 October 1969, while paying a visit to the northern town of Las Anod, Somalian President Shermarke was shot dead by one of his bodyguards. His assassination was quickly followed by a military coup d'état on 21 October 1969 (the day after his funeral), in which the Somali Army seized power without encountering armed opposition. The putsch was spearheaded by Major General Mohamed Siad Barre, who at the time commanded the army.

Supreme Revolutionary Council

Alongside Barre, the Supreme Revolutionary Council (SRC) that assumed power after President Sharmarke's assassination was led by Lieutenant Colonel Salaad Gabeyre Kediye and Chief of Police Jama Ali Korshel. Kediye officially held the title of "Father of the Revolution", and Barre shortly afterwards became the head of the SRC. The SRC subsequently renamed the country the Somali Democratic Republic, dissolved the parliament and the Supreme Court, and suspended the constitution.

In addition to Soviet funding and arms support provided to Somalia, Egypt sent to the country millions of dollars' worth of arms shipments.

Though the United States had offered Somalia arms support prior to the invasion, it was withdrawn following the news of Somali troops operating in the Ogaden Region.

Somali strategy
Under the leadership of General Mohammad Ali Samatar, Irro and other senior Somali military officials were tasked in 1977 with formulating a national strategy in preparation for the war against Ethiopia. This was part of a broader effort to unite all of the Somali-inhabited territories in the Horn region into a Greater Somalia (Soomaaliweyn).

A distinguished graduate of the Soviet Frunze Military Academy, Samatar oversaw Somalia's military strategy. During the Ogaden War, Samatar was the Commander-in-Chief of the Somali Armed Forces. He and his frontline deputies faced off against their mentor and former Frunze alumnus, General Vasily Petrov, assigned by the USSR to advise the Ethiopian Army. A further 15,000 Cuban troops, led by General Arnaldo Ochoa, also supported Ethiopia. General Samatar was assisted in the offensive by several field commanders, most of whom were also Frunze graduates:

General Yussuf Salhan commanded the SNA on the Jijiga Front, assisted by Colonel A. Naji, capturing the area on August 30, 1977. (Salhan later became Minister of Tourism but was expelled from the Somali Socialist Party in 1985.)

Colonel Abdullahi Yusuf Ahmed commanded the SNA on the Negellie Front. (Ahmed later led the rebel SSDF group based in Ethiopia. He was arrested by Ethiopia's Mengistu, and released after the collapse of the Mengistu regime in 1991.)

Colonel Abdullahi Ahmed Irro commanded the SNA on the Godey Front. (He later retired and became a Professor of Strategy in Mogadishu.)

Colonel Ali Hussein commanded the SNA in two fronts, Qabri Dahare and Harar. (Hussein eventually joined the Somali National Movement in late 1988.)

Colonel Farah Handulle commanded the SNA on the Warder Front. (He became a civilian administrator and Governor of Sanaag, and in 1987 was killed in Hargheisa one day before he took over governorship of the region.)

General Mohamed Nur Galaal, assisted by Colonel Mohamud Sh. Abdullahi Geelqaad, commanded Dirir-Dewa, which the SNA retreated from. (Galaal later became Minister of Public Works and leading member of the ruling Somali Revolutionary Socialist Party.)

Colonel Abdulrahman Aare and Colonel Ali Ismail co-commanded the Degeh-Bur Front. (Both officers were later chosen to reinforce the Harar campaign; Aare eventually became a military attaché and retired as a private citizen after the SNA's collapse in 1990.)

Colonel Abukar Liban 'Aftooje' initially served as acting logistics coordinator for the Southern Command and later commanded the SNA on the Iimeey Front. (Aftoje became a general and military attaché to France.)

Somali Air Force
The Somali Air Force was primarily organized along Soviet lines, as its officer corps was trained in the USSR.

Somali Air Force operational aircraft

Derg

In September 1974, Emperor Haile Selassie had been overthrown by the Derg military council, marking a period of turmoil. The Derg quickly fell into internal conflict to determine who would have primacy. Meanwhile, various anti-Derg groups as well as separatist movements began emerging throughout the country.

One of the separatist groups seeking to take advantage of the chaos was the pro-Somalia Western Somali Liberation Front (WSLF) operating in the Somali-inhabited Ogaden; by late 1975, the group had attacked numerous government outposts. WSLF controlled most of the Ogaden, the first time since World War II that all of Somalia had been united (with the exception of the Northern Frontier District in Kenya). The victory in Ogaden occurred primarily because of support from the Harari populace who had aligned with the WSLF. From 1976 to 1977, Somalia supplied arms and other aid to the WSLF.

Opposition to the reign of the Derg was the main cause of the Ethiopian Civil War. This conflict began as extralegal violence between 1975 and 1977, known as the Red Terror, when the Derg struggled for authority, first with various opposition groups within the country, then with a variety of groups jockeying for the role of vanguard party. Though human rights violations were committed by all sides, the great majority of abuses against civilians as well as actions leading to devastating famine were committed by the government.

A sign that order had been restored among Derg factions was the announcement on February 11, 1977 that Mengistu Haile Mariam had become head of state. However, the country remained in chaos as the military attempted to suppress its civilian opponents in a period known as the Red Terror (Qey Shibir in Amharic). Despite the violence, the Soviet Union, which had been closely observing developments, came to believe that Ethiopia was developing into a genuine Marxist–Leninist state and that it was in Soviet interests to aid the new regime. They therefore secretly approached Mengistu with offers of aid, which he accepted. Ethiopia closed the U.S. military mission and its communications center in April 1977.

In June 1977, Mengistu accused Somalia of infiltrating SNA soldiers into the Somali area to fight alongside the WSLF. Despite considerable evidence to the contrary, Barre strongly denied this, saying SNA "volunteers" were being allowed to help the WSLF.

Ethiopian Air Force
The Ethiopian Air Force (ETAP) was formed thanks to British and Swedish aid during the 1940s and 1950s, and started receiving significant US support in the 1960s. Despite its small size, the ETAP was an elite force, consisting of hand-picked officers and running an intensive training program for airmen at home and abroad.

The Ethiopian Air Force benefited from a US Air Force aid program. A team of US Air Force officers and NCOs assessed the force and provided recommendations as part of the Military Advisory and Assistance Group. The ETAP was restructured as a US-style organization. Emphasis was given to training institutions. Ethiopian personnel were sent to the US for training, including 25 Ethiopian pilots for jet training, and many more were trained locally by US Defense personnel.

Prior to 1974, the Ethiopian Air Force mainly consisted of a dozen F-86 Sabres and a dozen F-5A Freedom Fighters. In 1974, Ethiopia requested the delivery of McDonnell Douglas F-4 Phantom fighters, but the US instead offered it 16 Northrop F-5E Tiger IIs, armed with AIM-9 Sidewinder air-to-air missiles, and two Westinghouse AN/TPS-43D mobile radars (one of which was later positioned in Jijiga). Due to human rights violations in the country, only 8 F-5E Tiger IIs had been delivered by 1976.

Ethiopian Air Force operational aircraft

Castro's trip to Aden
When the Cubans and the Soviets learned of Somali plans to annex the Ogaden, Castro flew in March 1977 to Aden, South Yemen, where he suggested an Ethiopian-Somali-Yemeni Socialist Federation. Castro's plan didn't get any support, and two months later Somali forces attacked the Ethiopians. Cuba, supported by troops from the USSR and South Yemen, sided with Ethiopia.

History

Course of the war

Somali invasion (July–August 1977)
The Somali National Army (SNA) committed to invade the Ogaden on July 12, 1977, according to Ethiopian Ministry of National Defense documents (other sources state July 13 or 23).

According to Ethiopian sources, the invaders numbered 70,000 troops, 40 fighter planes, 250 tanks, 350 armored personnel carriers (APCs), and 600 artillery pieces, amounting to nearly the entire Somali Army. Soviet officials put the number of attacking Somali forces at 23,000 servicemen, 150 T-34 and 50 T-54/55 tanks, and 250 APCs including BTR-50PKs, BTR-152s and BTR-60PBs. In addition to Somali regular troops, another 15,000 WSLF fighters were also present in the Ogaden.

By the end of July, 60% of the Ogaden had been taken by the SNA-WSLF force, including Gode on the Shebelle River. The attacking Somali forces did suffer some early setbacks; Ethiopian defenders at Dire Dawa and Jijiga inflicted heavy casualties on assaulting forces. The Ethiopian Air Force (ETAP) also began to establish air superiority using its Northrop F-5s, despite initially being outnumbered by Somali MiG-21s.

However, Somalia easily overpowered Ethiopian military hardware and technology. Soviet General Vasily Petrov had to report back to Moscow the "sorry state" of the Ethiopian Army. The 3rd and 4th Ethiopian Infantry Divisions that suffered the brunt of the Somali invasion had practically ceased to exist.

The USSR, finding itself supplying both sides of the war, attempted to mediate a ceasefire. When their efforts failed, the Soviets abandoned Somalia. All aid to Siad Barre's regime was halted, while arms shipments to Ethiopia were increased. A Soviet military airlift with advisors for Ethiopia took place (second in magnitude only to the colossal October 1973 resupplying of Syrian forces during the Yom Kippur War), alongside 15,000 Cuban combat troops in a military role.

Other communist countries like South Yemen and North Korea offered Ethiopia military assistance. East Germany offered training, engineering and support troops. Israel reportedly provided cluster bombs, napalm and were also allegedly flying combat aircraft for Ethiopia. In November 1977, Somalia broke diplomatic relations with the USSR, expelled all Soviet experts from the country, abrogated the 1974 treaty of friendship, and cut off diplomatic relations with Cuba.

Not all communist states sided with Ethiopia. Because of the Sino-Soviet rivalry, China supported Somalia diplomatically and with token military aid. Romania under Nicolae Ceauşescu had a habit of breaking with Soviet policies and also maintained good diplomatic relations with Barre.

By 17 August 1977, elements of the Somali Army had reached the outskirts of Dire Dawa; the outcome of the battle for the strategic city would prove critical. Not only was Ethiopia's second largest air base located there, but the city represented both its crossroads into the Ogaden and rail lifeline to the Red Sea. If the Somalis took Dire Dawa, Ethiopia would be unable to export its crops or bring in equipment needed to continue the fight.

History Professor Gebru Tareke wrote that the Somalis advanced on the city with two motorized brigades, one tank battalion and one BM-13 battery. Facing these were the Ethiopian Second Militia Division, the 201 Nebelbal battalion, 781st battalion of the 78th Brigade, 4th Mechanized Company, and a tank platoon with two tanks.

Both sides were aware of the stakes; fighting was ferocious, but after two days, despite initially taking the airport, the Somalis were forced to withdraw. After the Ethiopians repulsed the assault, the city was never again at risk of attack.

Somali victories and siege of Harar (September–January)

The greatest single victory of the SNA-WSLF was the assault on Jijiga in mid-September 1977, in which demoralized Ethiopian troops withdrew from the town. The local defenders were no match for the assaulting Somalis, and the Ethiopian military was forced to withdraw past the strategic strongpoint of the Marda Pass, halfway between Jijiga and Harar. By September, Ethiopia was forced to admit that it controlled only about 10% of the Ogaden and that the Ethiopian defenders had been pushed back into the non-Somali areas of Harerge, Bale, and Sidamo.

However, the Somalis were unable to press their advantage because of the high attrition of its tank battalions, constant Ethiopian air attacks on their supply lines, and the onset of the rainy season which made dirt roads unusable. And in a few months, the Ethiopian government had managed to raise, train and integrate a 100,000-strong militia into its regular fighting force. In addition, although the Ethiopian Army was historically a client of U.S weapons, it was able to hastily adapt to new Warsaw Pact bloc weaponry.

Throughout the war, there were sharp tensions between the SNA and WSLF forces. The WSLF resented the fact that Somali political commissars insisted on direct Somali government control over conquered territory. Particularly bothersome to the WSLF were incidents in which Somali officials tore down WSLF battle flags raised over conquered areas and replaced them with the flag of Somalia.

From October 1977 until January 1978, SNA-WSLF forces fought the Battle of Harar, a city in which 40,000 Ethiopians had regrouped and re-armed themselves with Soviet-supplied artillery and armor. Backed by 1,500 Soviet advisors and 16,000 Cuban soldiers, the Ethiopians viciously fought back against the attackers. Though Somali forces reached the outskirts of Harar by November, they were too exhausted to take the city and eventually had to withdraw to await the Ethiopian counterattack. At this point, total wartime casualties among the Somalis may have totaled as many as 40,000.

Ethiopian-Cuban counterattack (February–March)
The expected Ethiopian-Cuban counterattack occurred in early February; however, it was accompanied by a second attack the Somalis did not expect. A column of Ethiopian and Cuban troops crossed northeast into the highlands between Jijiga and the border with Somalia, bypassing the SNA-WSLF force defending the Marda Pass. Soviet Mil Mi-6 and Mil Mi-8 helicopters airlifted a Cuban battalion behind enemy lines.

The attackers were thus able to attack from two directions in a pincer movement, allowing the re-capture of Jijiga in only two days and inflicting 3,000–6,000 casualties on the Somalis. The Somali defense collapsed, and every major Somali-occupied town was recaptured in the following weeks. Cuban artillery and aerial assaults wreaked a terrible toll on Somali forces.

Recognizing that his position was untenable, Siad Barre ordered the SNA to retreat back into Somalia on 9 March 1978, although Rene LaFort claims that the Somalis, having foreseen the inevitable, had already withdrawn their heavy weapons. The last significant Somali unit left Ethiopia on 15 March 1978, marking the end of the war.

Effects of the war
Executions and rape of civilians and refugees by Ethiopian and Cuban troops were prevalent throughout the war. A large Cuban contingent remained in Ethiopia after the war to protect the socialist government. Assisted by Soviet advisors, the Cuban contingent launched a second offensive in December 1979 directed at the population's means of survival, including the poisoning and destruction of wells and killing of cattle herds.

Following the withdrawal of the SNA, the WSLF continued its insurgency. By May 1980, the rebels, with the assistance of a small number of SNA soldiers who continued helping their guerrilla war, controlled a substantial region of the Ogaden. But by 1981, the insurgents, reduced to sporadic hit-and-run attacks, had been defeated. In addition, the WSLF and Somali Abbo Liberation Front (SALF) were significantly weakened after the war. The former was practically defunct by the late 1980s, and its splinter group, the Ogaden National Liberation Front (ONLF), operated from headquarters in Kuwait. Even though elements of the ONLF would later manage to slip back into the Ogaden, their actions had little impact.

For the Barre regime, the invasion was perhaps the greatest strategic blunder since independence, and it greatly weakened the military. Almost one-third of regular SNA soldiers, three-eighths of its armored units, and half of the Somali Air Force (SAF) were lost. The weakness of the Barre administration led it to effectively abandon the dream of a unified Greater Somalia. The failure of the war aggravated discontent with the Barre regime; the first organized opposition group, the Somali Salvation Democratic Front (SSDF), was formed by army officers in 1979.

The United States adopted Somalia as a Cold War ally from the late 1970s to 1988 in exchange for use of Somali bases it used for access to the Middle East, and as a way to exert influence in the Horn of Africa. A second armed clash in 1988 between Somalia and Ethiopia ended when the two countries agreed to withdraw their armed forces from the border.

Refugee crisis 
Somalia's defeat in the war caused an influx of Ethiopian refugees (mostly ethnic Somalis and some Oromo) across the border to Somalia. By 1979, official figures reported 1.3 million refugees in Somalia, more than half of them settled in the lands of the Isaaq clan-family in the north. As the state became increasingly reliant on international aid, aid resources allocated for the refugees caused further resentment from local Isaaq residents, especially as they felt no effort was made on the government's part to compensate them for bearing the burden of the war.

Furthermore, Barre heavily favoured the Ogaden refugees, who belonged to the same clan (Darod) as him. Due to these ties, Ogaden refugees enjoyed preferential access to "social services, business licenses and even government posts." As expressed animosity and discontent in the north grew, Barre armed the Ogaden refugees, and in doing so created an irregular army operating inside Isaaq territories. The armed Ogaden refugees, together with members of the Marehan and Dhulbahanta soldiers (who were provoked and encouraged by the Barre regime) started a terror campaign against the local Isaaqs, raping women, murdering unarmed civilians, and preventing families from conducting proper burials.

Barre ignored Isaaq complaints throughout the 1980s. This, in addition to Barre's suppression of criticism or even discussion of widespread atrocities in the north, had the effect of turning long-standing Isaaq disaffection into open opposition, with many Isaaq forming the Somali National Movement, leading to the ten-year civil war in northwestern Somalia (today the de facto state of Somaliland).

See also
 Soviet Union-Africa relations#Ethiopia

References

Notes

Bibliography

 
 
 
 
 
 
 
 
 
 Woodroofe, Louise P. "Buried in the Sands of the Ogaden": The United States, the Horn of Africa, and the Demise of Detente (Kent State University Press; 2013) 176 pages.

External links
 Ogaden War 1976–1978 at OnWar.com
 at GlobalSecurity.org
 Cuban Aviation at the Ogaden War
 Adam Lockyer, Opposing Foreign Intervention’s Impact on the Course of Civil Wars: the Ethiopian-Ogaden Civil War, 1976–1980

 
Cold War conflicts
Cold War in Africa
Conflicts in 1977
Conflicts in 1978
1977 in Ethiopia
1977 in Somalia
1978 in Ethiopia
1978 in Somalia
Ethiopian Civil War
Proxy wars
Wars involving Ethiopia
Wars involving Somalia
Wars involving the states and peoples of Africa
Wars involving Cuba
Wars involving the Soviet Union
Wars involving Yemen
Rebellions in Africa
Cuba–Soviet Union relations
Ethiopia–Somalia military relations
Ethiopia–Soviet Union relations